Brett Swain (born 14 February 1974) is an Australian cricketer. He played in twenty-three first-class and nineteen List A matches for South Australia between 1994 and 2002.

See also
 List of South Australian representative cricketers

References

External links
 

1974 births
Living people
Australian cricketers
South Australia cricketers
Cricketers from Adelaide